(born 25 October 1968), born Zhao Duoduo, is a Chinese-born table tennis player who represented Japan at the 1996 Summer Olympics.

References

1968 births
Living people
Table tennis players from Liaoning
Japanese female table tennis players
Chinese emigrants to Japan
Chinese female table tennis players
Table tennis players at the 1996 Summer Olympics
Olympic table tennis players of Japan
Naturalised table tennis players
Japanese sportspeople of Chinese descent